"Good Love" is a song by American rapper Sheek Louch, released as the first single from his third album Silverback Gorilla (2008). The song samples "Tonight Is The Night" by Betty Wright and was produced by Red Spyda. The song is about him touring and meeting different women but all he is really looking for is Good Love.  The song was ranked #30 on the www.about.com "Top 100 Rap Songs of 2008".

Music video
The music video was directed by Todd Angkasuwan. A behind-the-scenes was released on February 1. It consists of him going to different places and meeting different women. The video was premiered in February.

Chart performances

References

2008 singles
American hip hop songs
MNRK Music Group singles
2008 songs